Toni Lewis is an American actress best known for playing Terri Stivers on Homicide: Life on the Street. The role led to her receiving a nomination for an NAACP Image Award for Outstanding Supporting Actress in a Drama Series. She is also known for playing Valerie Murphy on As the World Turns.

She is married to music editor Chris Tergesen, brother of Lee Tergesen, who played Officer Chris Thormann in Homicide: Life on the Street.

References

External links
 

Living people
African-American actresses
American television actresses
Place of birth missing (living people)
Year of birth missing (living people)
21st-century African-American people
21st-century African-American women